Velasquez Airport  is an airport serving the Magdalena River town of Puerto Boyacá in the Boyacá Department of Colombia.

See also

Transport in Colombia
List of airports in Colombia

References

External links
OpenStreetMap - Puerto Boyacá
OurAirports - Puerto Boyacá
SkyVector - Puerto Boyacá
FallingRain - Puerto Boyacá Airport

Airports in Colombia